Nauk Ma Kya Kyay or Don't Late is a 2004 Burmese musical dramatic film, directed by Mg Myo Min (Yin Twin Phit). In this film, starred Myanmar movie stars, Dwe, Khine Thin Kyi , Eaindra Kyaw Zin, Aung Lwin, Nhat Pyaw Kyaw, Pho Phyu, A Yine, King Kong, Ku Tho, Aye Yar, Nyi Nanda, Min Kha, Nyo Min Lwin, Zin Myo, Phoe Kyaw, Shon Lai Oo, University Gon Pon, Ein Phyu, Phu Sone. The film was produced by Lucky Seven film production and distribution company.

Synopsis 

A university student, Saw Oo struggles with his former girlfriend, Khin Naun, and his new partner, Nat Ta Mi. Khin Naun once loved Saw Oo, but marries another man due to Oo's lackadaisical nature. This film follows his life as he tries to find love and harmony.

Cast

Dwe as Saw Oo
Khine Thin Kyi as Khin Naun
Eaindra Kyaw Zin as Nat Ta Mi
Aung Lwin
Nhat Pyaw Kyaw
Pho Phyu
A Yine
King Kong
Ku Tho
Aye Yar
Nyi Nanda
Min Kha
Nyo Min Lwin
Zin Myo
Phoe Kyaw
Shon Lai Oo
University Gon Pon
Ein Phyu
Phu Sone

Release
Naug Ma Kja Kyay was released on December 3, 2004, at Twin, Tamata, Mingalar in Yangon, Win Lite, Myo Ma in Mandalay, Nyunt, Shwe Hin Tha, Ye Tan Kon in Bago, Bandola in Taunggyi and Gong in Baik, Tanintharyi Division.

References

2004 films
Burmese drama films
2004 drama films